The following is a list of actors who have played Mycroft Holmes in various media.

Radio and audio dramas

Television and DTV films

Television and streaming series

Theatrical films

Video games

See also
List of actors who have played Sherlock Holmes
List of actors who have played Dr. Watson
List of actors who have played Inspector Lestrade
List of actors who have played Mrs. Hudson
List of actors who have played Professor Moriarty

References 

Actors who have played Mycroft Holmes
Holmes, Mycroft